Ambiciosa (English: Ambitious) is a Mexican drama film directed by Ernesto Cortazar. It was released in 1953 starring Meche Barba and Fernando Fernández.

Plot
Estela Durán (Meche Barba) is a young Cuban woman of humble origin, who lives with her nanny Mama Irene (Fedora Capdevila). Estela despises poverty. One day she meets a talent scout for a film production company in Mexico. The two strike up an affair, causing the separation of the talent scouts with his wife. Estela has no interest in formalizing with him, but only for an opportunity in film. Arriving in Mexico is related to Oscar (Crox Alvarado), one of the partners of the producer who would meet her whims to get into trouble because of the debutante. Estela is able to snatch the characters to other actresses provided to meet her target. On the set of a movie, Estela knows Manuel (Fernando Fernández), who works in the camcorder stagehand and sustains a romance, until she meets Jose Antonio (Alberto González Rubio), a millionaire who she falls in love. She tries not to hurt him away and hurt, leading to this tragedy.

Cast
 Meche Barba ... Estela Durán
 Fernando Fernández ... Manuel Campos
 Crox Alvarado ... Oscar Ramírez
 Dagoberto Rodríguez ... Federico
 Alberto González Rubio ... José Antonio
 Gloria Morell ... Cristina
 Fedora Capdevila ... Mamá Irene

Reviews
In Ambiciosa, Meche Barba is a young woman that climbs the ladder of the film industry through false and empty relationships. Somehow, portraying a sordid secret item and recognized in the film room. It is a curious and interesting film, made at the end of a filmography that Barba unexpectedly cut the following year. Meche Barba is amazing as a great villain in her performance, but who steals camera is the singer and actor Fernando Fernandez, who in the sequence where calls Barba for abandoning him, it does dramatically.

References

External links
 
 El Rincón de la Añoranza: The Jewels of Meche Barba...Ambiciosa

1953 films
Mexican black-and-white films
Rumberas films
1950s Spanish-language films
Mexican drama films
1953 drama films
1950s Mexican films